The following table shows the world record progression in the Men's 110 metres hurdles.

The first world record in the 110 metre hurdles for men (athletics) was recognized by the International Amateur Athletics Federation, now known as the International Association of Athletics Federations, in 1912. The IAAF ratified Forrest Smithson's 15.0 mark set at the 1908 London Olympic Games as the inaugural record.

To June 21, 2009, the IAAF has ratified 39 world records in the event.

Records 1912–1976

Records 1977–present

From 1975, the IAAF accepted separate automatically electronically timed records for events up to 400 metres. Starting January 1, 1977, the IAAF required fully automatic timing to the hundredth of a second for these events.

Rod Milburn's 1972 Olympic gold medal victory time of 13.24 was the fastest recorded result to that time.

References

110 hs
World record